The 1965 World Women's Handball Championship took place in West Germany in 1965.

Preliminary round

Group A

Group B

Placement Matches

Seventh Place Playoff

Fifth Place Playoff

Third Place Playoff

Final

Final standings

References

 

World Handball Championship tournaments
W
W
W
W
Women's handball in Germany
November 1965 sports events in Europe